Lewis Thomas Gard (born 26 August 1999) is an English professional footballer who plays as a midfielder for National League South club Tonbridge Angels.

Career

Youth and Southend

Born in Basildon, Essex, Gard grew up in Langdon Hills and attended St Thomas More High School for Boys in Westcliff-on-Sea. He started his career in the youth system at Southend United who he joined at the age of eight. After progressing through the youth team he signed a scholarship in June 2015.

Aveley (loan)

In December 2017 he joined Isthmian League North Division side Aveley on loan and made twelve appearances and scored twice during his month loan spell.

Southend United Senior Team
Upon his return he made his Southend first team debut on 24 April 2018 in a 3–0 win over Oldham Athletic when he replaced Theo Robinson as a late substitute.

On 30 September 2021, he was sent out on loan to Isthmian League Division One North side Heybridge Swifts.

Tonbridge Angels
On 10 June 2022, Gard joined National League South club Tonbridge Angels.

Career statistics

References

External links

1999 births
Living people
People from Brentwood, Essex
English footballers
Association football midfielders
Southend United F.C. players
Aveley F.C. players
Heybridge Swifts F.C. players
Tonbridge Angels F.C. players
English Football League players
Isthmian League players